Kevin Ray Gainer (born December 4, 1997), known professionally as K Suave, is an American rapper, singer and songwriter.

Career 
In April 2020, Gainer released his mixtape B4 the SexTape. In July 2020, he released his mixtape Love Sick. In September 2020, he released his mixtape 7 Minutes in Heaven. In December 2020, he released his mixtape Thot Slayer 2. In April 2021, he and fellow rapper Ely Nash released a music video for their collaborative single "Blood on the Opps". In May 2021, Gainer released his single "Sexually Active" with American rapper Trippie Redd, which used the same loop as Trippie's song "Miss the Rage". In September 2021, he toured alongside Trippie Redd as part of the latter's Trip at Knight tour. In November 2021, he appeared on D. Savage's album BPL. In December 2021, he released his project Sexually Active which included appearances from Trippie Redd, as well as fellow rappers Autumn, D. Savage, Kankan, Buddah Bands, KobeNoBryant and Zelly Ocho. Also in December 2021, he appeared on Trippie's mixtape Hate Is Dead. In May 2022, he released his single "DayCare" alongside a music video directed by American director DotComNirvan. In July 2022, Gainer performed alongside Trippie Redd at the Brixton Academy in London.

Musical style 
Gainer is noted as using heavily distorted synth samples in his songs.

Discography

Mixtapes

References

External links 
 

1997 births
21st-century American male musicians
Living people
People from Ohio
Rappers from Ohio